Billy Roberts was an American musician.

Billy Roberts may also refer to:

Billy Roberts (footballer, born 1880), John William Roberts, footballer
Billy Roberts (Australian footballer) (1908–1998), Australian rules footballer

See also
William Roberts (disambiguation)